Adélẹ́yẹ is a surname  of Yoruba origin, and meaning "the crown or royalty owns chieftaincy". Notable people with the surname include:

 David Adeleye (born 1996), British boxer
 Dele Adeleye (born 1988), Nigerian footballer
 John Adeleye (born 1980), English singer
 Ryan Adeleye (born 1987), American-Israeli soccer player

References